Morehead City is a port town in Carteret County, North Carolina, United States. The population was 8,661 at the 2010 census. Morehead City celebrated the 150th anniversary of its founding on May 5, 2007. It forms part of the Crystal Coast.

History
By the early 1850s, a group of investors had been formed and incorporated a land development project known as the "Shepard Point Land Company," which purchased  of land on the eastern tip of the peninsula bordering the Newport River, known then as "Shepards Point," which is the present location of Morehead City. The Shepard Point Land Company's objective was to take advantage of the natural deep channel of Topsail Inlet, known today as the Beaufort Inlet, which splits Bogue Banks from Shackleford Banks and provides access to Morehead City, Beaufort, North Carolina, the Newport River and the Intracoastal Waterway. The Shepard Point Land Company was established to construct a deepwater port to allow another access point for North Carolina timber products to relieve pressure at the port located in Wilmington. To make the port accessible to the interior of North Carolina, the Atlantic and North Carolina Railroad line between Goldsboro and New Bern was completed on April 29, 1858.

North Carolina Governor John Motley Morehead, for whom the city of Morehead City is named, was a principal member of the Shepard Point Land Company investment group. Fully operational rail service began in July 1858 connecting the town to points west, north, and south.

The town of Morehead City was laid out using a grid plan, whereby city blocks were equally laid out with each block consisting of 16 equally divided lots. The city blocks stretched from 1st Street to 15th Street, incorporating a system of alleys forming an "H" shape that enabled businesses and residential homes to be served from the alleys behind them.

Morehead City was officially incorporated by the North Carolina Senate in 1860, at which time the total number of households consisted of only 300 individual families.

The town continued to prosper until the Civil War, when in 1862 it was occupied by Federal troops. The war disrupted commerce, and the economy of the port declined along with the town's population. It was not until the 1880s, with the construction of the Atlantic Hotel at the tip of the peninsula and its promotion by the railroad as the "Summer Capital by the Sea," that the area began to experience a resurgence. The popularity of this particular hotel, with its train depot entrance, grand ballroom, piers, sailing, and ferries to the beaches of Bogue Banks, helped to establish Morehead City as a summer destination.

It was also during the 1880s and 1890s that fishermen who had lived on the island of Shackleford Banks moved on to the mainland (often transporting their houses by boat from the outer banks), settling in the areas between 10th and 15th streets and calling it the Promised Land. These fishermen became the nucleus of the fishing industry that has remained an important part of the town's economy.

The Great Depression and World War II markedly altered the character of the town. The traditional downtown area had deteriorated and, as newer stores opened further west, the decay in the old center of town accelerated. Finally, in the 1980s, a renewal began when the town obtained a Community Development Block Grant to replace an aging infrastructure and improve the appearance of the waterfront area. Subsequent grants, private investment, and town monies have maintained the forward momentum, so that the town now has a new sea wall, underground utilities, brick paved walkways with planters along the waterfront, all in the downtown area, and tree-lined streets, renovated houses, new docks and new businesses.

The Morehead City Historic District and Morehead City Municipal Building are listed on the National Register of Historic Places.

Today's community

Morehead City's economy is based predominantly on a variety of ecotourism activities, a growing retirement community, and the Port of Morehead City. The local economy is based further on the Port of Morehead City, light industry and manufacturing, land development, light commercial fishing, sport fishing, and other service-oriented businesses. The town is within easy access of New Bern, Havelock and Jacksonville, North Carolina.

Morehead City is one of two existing ports in North Carolina which primarily export phosphate. The Port of Morehead City features a dry-bulk facility with a 225,000-ton capacity warehouse and extended open storage facilities. SpaceX fairing recovery vessels Ms. Tree and Ms. Chief utilize the port during launch and fairing recovery operations as a safe harbor in the event of inclement weather at sea or if there is an extended launch delay.

Carteret General Hospital in Morehead City is the second largest employer in Carteret County, behind the Carteret County Public Schools.

Morehead City is home to an annual "Bald Is Beautiful" convention and is the home of the headquarters of the Bald-Headed Men of America organization.

Higher education and marine research
Carteret Community College serves the undergraduate community with two-year associate degree programs focused primarily on trades and service sector occupations. There are several world-class postgraduate programs and research organizations in the area, including the University of North Carolina's Institute of Marine Sciences, North Carolina State University's Center for Marine Sciences and Technology, and the Duke University Marine Lab in nearby Beaufort.

Morehead City also is home to the Research and Compliance Branch North Carolina Marine Fisheries Division, a governmental organization.

Inshore and offshore recreational fishing
Morehead City and the surrounding area is an excellent venue for fishermen of all varieties. There are many opportunities for recreational fishing when in Morehead City because of its pristine estuaries and close proximity to the Continental Shelf and Gulf Stream. The Gulf Stream is a powerful, warm and swift Atlantic Ocean current that originates at the tip of Florida and follows the coastline of the eastern United States to Newfoundland before crossing the Atlantic Ocean, bringing large sport fish species such as the Atlantic blue marlin and other billfish close to the North Carolina coastline.

Established in 1957, the Big Rock Blue Marlin Tournament draws large crowds of sporting enthusiasts of all types to Morehead City each year to witness some of the largest Atlantic blue marlin catches in North America.

Scuba diving
In addition to a thriving sport fishing industry, Morehead City and surrounding areas are a popular scuba diving destination. The waters off the coast of North Carolina are often referred to as the "Graveyard of the Atlantic", a legacy that attracts divers from all over the world. Morehead City sits comfortably between a number of famous wrecks, including the German submarine U-352, a wreck discovered in part by the late Morehead resident George Purifoy.

Traditional sports

Morehead City is home to the Morehead City Marlins of the Coastal Plain League, a collegiate summer baseball league.  The Marlins play at O'Neal Field at Big Rock Stadium in Morehead City, and began playing in the 2010 season.

Youth sports in Morehead City include Little League Baseball, soccer leagues, and basketball leagues.

Geography
Morehead City is located southwest of the center of Carteret County at  (34.727700, -76.746748). It occupies a peninsula bordered to the south by Bogue Sound and to the north and east by the tidal Newport River. Across the river to the east is the town of Beaufort, while to the south across Bogue Sound is Atlantic Beach.

Climate
Morehead City has a humid subtropical climate (Cfa) with long, hot summers and short, cool winters.

Note

Demographics

2020 census

As of the 2020 United States census, there were 9,556 people, 4,428 households, and 2,276 families residing in the town.

2000 census
As of the census of 2000, there were 7,691 people, 3,597 households, and 1,985 families residing in the town. The population density was 1,507.6 people per square mile (582.3/km). There were 4,296 housing units at an average density of 842.1 per square mile (325.2/km). The racial makeup of the town was 81.71% White, 13.98% Black (U.S. Census), 0.66% Native American, 0.77% Asian, 0.04% Pacific Islander, 1.13% from other races, and 1.72% from two or more races. Hispanic or Latino of any race were 2.34% of the population.

There were 3,597 households, out of which 23.5% had children under the age of 18 living with them, 37.9% were married couples living together, 13.7% had a female householder with no husband present, and 44.8% were non-families. 39.0% of all households were made up of individuals, and 16.5% had someone living alone who was 65 years of age or older. The average household size was 2.06 and the average family size was 2.73.

In the town the age distribution of the population shows 20.2% under the age of 18, 7.7% from 18 to 24, 27.2% from 25 to 44, 24.1% from 45 to 64, and 20.8% who were 65 years of age or older. The median age was 41 years. For every 100 females, there were 83.8 males. For every 100 females age 18 and over, there were 78.3 males.

The median income for a household in the town was $28,737, and the median income for a family was $39,290. Males had a median income of $26,852 versus $21,995 for females. The per capita income for the town was $19,138. About 12.1% of families and 14.6% of the population were below the poverty line, including 21.7% of those under age 18 and 12.3% of those age 65 or over.

Transportation

Highways
 NC 24 (often used to transport U.S. Marines to and from Camp Lejeune)
 US 70

Future Interstates
 Interstate 42

Train
Amtrak provides a Thruway Bus to Wilson that connects with the daily Palmetto train to New York City and Savannah, Georgia, as well as the daily Carolinian train to New York City and Charlotte.

Into the early 1950s, the Atlantic and East Carolina Railway ran a daily passenger train to Goldsboro' s Union Station. The connections at Goldsboro were timed to accommodate a local Southern Railway overnight train (#111/#112, in final years, #11/#112) to parts in central and western North Carolina, comparable to the North Carolina section of the Carolina Special.

The North Carolina Department of Transportation as of 2007 was studying the resumption of intercity passenger train service from Raleigh through Goldsboro to Morehead City.

Hospital
 Carteret Health Care

Education

Elementary schools
 Morehead City Primary School
 Morehead City Elementary School at Camp Glenn

Middle schools

 Morehead Middle School

High schools
 West Carteret High School

Higher learning
 Carteret Community College
 UNC-Chapel Hill Institute of Marine Sciences
 NCSU Center for Marine Sciences and Technology

Private schools
 St. Egbert's Catholic School

Media

Newspapers
The Carteret County News-Times is the local newspaper, published three times a week, and is owned by Carteret Publishing Company.

Television

Morehead City is part of the Greenville–New Bern–Jacksonville designated market area, which was the 109th largest in 2007 (according to Nielsen Media Research). Broadcast Television Stations serving the market include:
 WITN-TV, the (7), Washington (NBC affiliate)
 WNCT-TV, the (9), Greenville (CBS affiliate) the CW on their digital subchannel
 WCTI-TV, the (12), New Bern (ABC affiliate, independent "ENC-TV" On Digital)
 WYDO-TV, the (14), Greenville (Fox affiliate)
 WUNM-TV, the (19), Jacksonville (PBS affiliate of the PBS North Carolina Network)
 WPXU-TV, the (35), Jacksonville (i network/My Network affiliate)

Radio stations
 88.3 FM:  WXBE AFR (Christian)
 89.3 FM:  WTEB Public Radio East (NPR/Classical)
 90.7 FM:  WOTJ FBN (Sacred Christian)
 91.5 FM:  WBJD Public Radio East (NPR)
 92.3 FM:  WQSL
 92.7 FM:  WBNK 92.7 The Beacon (Contemporary Christian)
 94.1 FM:  WNBU (Oldies)
 95.1 FM:  WRNS-FM 95.1 WRNS (Country)
 96.3 FM:  WRHT (Talk Radio)
 97.9 FM:  WNBB The Bear (Classic Country)
 98.7 FM:  WRMR Modern Rock 98.7 (Modern Rock)
 99.5 FM:  WMJV (Hot Adult Contemporary)
 100.3 FM: WLGP GNN (Christian)
 101.9 FM: WIKS 101.9 Kiss FM (Urban)
 103.3 FM: WMGV V 103.3 Soft Rock (AC)
 104.5 FM: WSTK
 105.1 FM:   WLGV K-LOVE 105.1 (Contemporary Christian)
 106.5 FM: WSFL-FM 106.5 WSFL (Classic Rock)
 107.1 FM: WTKF The Talk Station 107.1 (News/Talk)
 107.9 FM: WNCT-FM 107.9 WNCT (Classic Hits)
 1120 AM:  WSME (Classic Country/Bluegrass)

Notable people

References

External links

 
 Morehead City Attractions and Restaurants
 Carteret Health Care

Cities in North Carolina
Populated places established in 1855
Carteret County, North Carolina
1855 establishments in North Carolina
Port cities and towns of the United States Atlantic coast